Pure practical reason is the opposite of impure (or sensibly-determined) practical reason and appears in Immanuel Kant's Critique of Practical Reason and Groundwork of the Metaphysic of Morals.

It is the reason that drives actions without any sense dependent incentives. Human reasoning chooses such actions simply because those actions are good in themselves; this is the nature of good will, which Kant argues is the only concept that is good without any justification, it is good in itself and is a derivative of a transcendental law which affects the way humans practically reason (see practical philosophy).

References
 Immanuel Kant, Kritik der praktischen Vernunft, Stuttgart 1961, "Vorrede".
 Immanuel Kant, Grundlegung zur Metaphysik der Sitten, Vandenhoeck & Ruprecht, 2004, p. 106.

Immanuel Kant